The Dutch word Steen means "stone", and is used for "castle" or "fortress", as in the Gravensteen in Ghent, Belgium. It is also an alternative spelling of the Swedish and Danish word sten with the same meaning. It may refer to:

Steen (given name)
Steen (surname)
Steen, Minnesota, a small city in the United States
Steen (motorcycle), an American motorcycle company that produced motorcycles in the 1970s. 
Steen Township, Knox County, Indiana, United States
Het Steen, a castle in Belgium
Chenin blanc, a white wine commonly called "Steen" in South Africa

See also
Stein (disambiguation)
Stine, a surname and given name